Aïn El Berda is a district in Annaba Province, Algeria. It was named after its capital, Aïn El Berda. It is the least populous district in the province.

Municipalities
The district is further divided into 3 municipalities:
Aïn El Berda
El Eulma
Chorfa

Districts of Annaba Province

ar:عين الباردة